Vaishno Academy is an Indian film production company established by Tollywood director Puri Jagannadh. The company is based in Hyderabad.

Description
In 2002 Vaishno Academy produced its first production, Idiot. It was remade into Tamil and Hindi. Vaishno Academy produced Amma Nanna O Tamila Ammayi and Sivamani in 2003 and 143 (and I Miss You) in 2004. This film didn't do well at box office. In 2006 Pokiri was highest grosser of Vaishno Academy's films and highest grossing Telugu film of all time.

Film Production

References

Film production companies based in Hyderabad, India
Indian film studios
2002 establishments in Andhra Pradesh
Indian companies established in 2002